Barbara Ann Blakeley Oliver Marx Sinatra (March 10, 1927 – July 25, 2017) was an American model, showgirl, socialite and the fourth wife of Frank Sinatra.

Early life 
Barbara Ann Blakeley was born on March 10, 1927, in Bosworth, Missouri, the elder of two daughters. Her parents were Charles Willis Blakeley (June 29, 1895 – October 5, 1989) and Irene Prunty (née Toppass) Blakeley (June 22, 1907 – December 15, 1993). At age 10, she moved with her parents and younger sister, Patricia, to Wichita, Kansas, where she was raised. In 1946, she graduated from Wichita North High School.  At age 18, she moved to Long Beach, California.

Personal life

Marriage to Oliver 
She married Robert Oliver in September 1948 and had a son, Robert Blake "Bobby" Oliver on October 10, 1950. She divorced Oliver in 1952.

Marriage to Marx 
She married Zeppo Marx on September 18, 1959. Despite their divorce in 1973, she was thenceforth known as Barbara Marx.

Marriage to Sinatra 
She married Frank Sinatra on July 11, 1976. It was his fourth and final marriage, and her third and final marriage. It was also the longest-lasting marriage for both. She converted to Catholicism. According to her book, Lady Blue Eyes: My Life With Frank, "He [Frank] never asked me to change faith for him, but I could tell he was pleased that I'd consider it."

Upon his death in 1998, Frank Sinatra left her $3.5 million in assets, along with mansions in Beverly Hills, Malibu, and Palm Springs. She also inherited the rights to Sinatra's Trilogy recordings, most of his material possessions and control over his name and likeness.

Death 
Barbara Marx Sinatra died on July 25, 2017, in Rancho Mirage, California, of natural causes at the age of 90. She died a year before Frank's first wife, Nancy, who died on July 13, 2018, at the age of 101. She is buried at the Desert Memorial Park next to husband Frank.

Legacy
The Sinatras founded the Barbara Sinatra Children's Center in Rancho Mirage, California, in 1986. The center is adjacent to the Betty Ford Center on the campus of the Eisenhower Medical Center. The non-profit facility provides individual and group therapy for young victims of physical, sexual, and emotional abuse. In 1998, a Golden Palm Star on the Palm Springs Walk of Stars was dedicated to her.

References

External links
 
Barbara Sinatra at Find a Grave

1927 births
2017 deaths
American memoirists
American socialites
Burials at Desert Memorial Park
Converts to Roman Catholicism
Female models from Missouri
People from Carroll County, Missouri
People from Wichita, Kansas
20th-century American philanthropists
20th-century American women
21st-century American women
Sinatra family